The discography of Frenzal Rhomb consists of nine studio albums, two compilation albums, one demo album and one EP.

Albums

Studio albums

Compilation albums

EPs

Singles

References

Discographies of Australian artists